Siddheshwar, and Ratneshwar Temple is situated about  from Latur City of Maharashtra, India. The temple was built by King Tamradwaj.

There is a fair every year during Mahashivratri.

References

Hindu temples in Maharashtra
Latur
Tourist attractions in Latur district